Coronellaria is a genus of fungi in the family Dermateaceae. The genus contains 4 species.

Species 

Coronellaria aberrans
Coronellaria acori
Coronellaria amaena
Coronellaria amoena
Coronellaria benkertii
Coronellaria caricinella
Coronellaria castanopsidis
Coronellaria delitschiana
Coronellaria lunata
Coronellaria musicola
Coronellaria pulicaris
Coronellaria typhae

See also 

 List of Dermateaceae genera

References

External links 

 Coronellaria at Index Fungorum

Dermateaceae genera